The 1970 season was the Hawthorn Football Club's 46th season in the Victorian Football League and 69th overall.

Fixture

Premiership season

Ladder

References

Hawthorn Football Club seasons